Mount Talbot is located on the border of Alberta and British Columbia. It was officially named on 4 November 1925 after Senator Peter Talbot (1854-1919), an early pioneer of the Lacombe region of central Alberta. A teacher and farmer, he turned to politics and became an elected representative of the Northwest Territories and later the province of Alberta. In 1906, Sir Wilfrid Laurier appointed him to the Senate of Canada.

See also
 List of peaks on the Alberta–British Columbia border
 Mountains of Alberta
 Mountains of British Columbia

References

 Geographic Board of Canada. (1928). Place-Names of Alberta. Ottawa: Department of the Interior.

 Karamitsanis, A. (Ed.). (1991). Place names of Alberta: Mountains, mountain parks and foothills (Vol.1). Calgary,     Alberta: Alberta Culture and Multiculturalism, Friends of Geographical Names of Alberta Society, University of Calgary Press.

 The Lacombe and District Chamber of Commerce. (1982). Lacombe, the first century. Lacombe, Alberta: Author. 

Talbot
Talbot
Talbot